Méaudre is a former commune in the Isère department in southeastern France. On 1 January 2016, it was merged into the new commune of Autrans-Méaudre-en-Vercors.

It is located in the valley of the Vercors with ski resorts.

Population

Twin towns
Méaudre is twinned with:

  Locmaria, France

See also
Communes of the Isère department
Parc naturel régional du Vercors

References
Official site

Former communes of Isère
Isère communes articles needing translation from French Wikipedia